Devesh Singh Chauhan (born 11 December 1981 in Village Silayta, Etawah, Uttar Pradesh) is a field hockey goalkeeper from India, who made his international debut for the Men's National Team in early 2000. Chauhan represented his native country twice at the Summer Olympics, in 2000 (Sydney, Australia) and in 2004 (Athens, Greece), where India finished in seventh place on both occasions. Chauhan got Arjuna award in 2003 by gov't to India and Lakshman award in 2001; Yash Bharti award in 2005 and Ahilyabai Hillary award in 2006 by gov't to Uttar Pradesh. Chauhan is an alumnus of Jamia Millia Islamia, New Delhi.

References

External links

1981 births
Living people
Male field hockey goalkeepers
Field hockey players at the 2000 Summer Olympics
Field hockey players at the 2004 Summer Olympics
2002 Men's Hockey World Cup players
Olympic field hockey players of India
People from Etawah
Jamia Millia Islamia alumni
Asian Games medalists in field hockey
World Series Hockey players
Field hockey players at the 2002 Asian Games
Field hockey players from Uttar Pradesh
Indian male field hockey players
Asian Games silver medalists for India
Medalists at the 2002 Asian Games
Recipients of the Arjuna Award